Vera Renczi (dubbed the Black Widow, Mrs. Poison or Chatelaine of Berkerekul), was a Romanian serial killer who was charged with poisoning 35 individuals including her two husbands, multiple lovers, and her son with arsenic during the 1920s. 

Journalist Otto Tolischus published the earliest known article in the United States in May 1925 based on letters from the readers without naming any reference. Renczi's story has surfaced repeatedly, but without traceable details such as specific dates of her birth, marriages, arrest, conviction, incarceration or death. 

Most sources place the murders at Berkerekul, Yugoslavia (present-day Serbia), or Bečkerek, which changed the name to Zrenjanin in 1946; although, the spelling Berkerekul is unknown for this city. In 1972, the Guinness Book of World Records found no authoritative sources to support the claim that 35 people were killed by Renczi in early 20th-century Austro Hungarian Empire.

Early life
According to some accounts, Renczi was born in Bucharest in 1903, but in view of the dates of her alleged crimes, a date in the late 19th century would be more appropriate. The accounts of her life are lacking in verifiable documentary supporting evidence. Her mother died when she was 13 and she moved with her father to Nagybecskerek (today Zrenjanin, Serbia) where she attended a boarding school. By the age of fifteen, she had become increasingly unmanageable and had frequently run away from home with numerous boyfriends, many of whom were significantly older than she was. Early childhood friends described Renczi as having an almost pathological desire for constant male companionship and possessing a highly jealous and suspicious nature.

Shortly before the age of twenty, her first marriage was to a wealthy Austrian banker named Karl Schick, many years her senior. They had a son named Lorenzo. Left at home daily while her older husband worked, she began to suspect that her husband was being unfaithful. One evening, in a jealous rage, Renczi poisoned his dinner wine with arsenic and began to tell family, friends, and neighbors that he had abandoned her and their son. After approximately a year of "mourning", she then declared that she had heard word of her supposedly estranged husband's death in a car accident.

Subsequent murders
Shortly after allegedly hearing the news of her first husband's "automobile accident", Renczi remarried, this time to a man nearer her own age. However, the relationship was a tumultuous one and Renczi was again plagued by the suspicion that her new husband was involved in extramarital affairs. After only months of marriage the man vanished and Renczi then told friends and family that he had abandoned her. After a year had passed, she then claimed to have received a letter from her husband proclaiming his intentions of leaving her forever. This would be her last marriage.

Although Renczi did not remarry, she spent the next several years carrying out a number of affairs, some clandestine with married men, and others openly. The men came from an array of backgrounds and social positions. All would vanish within months, weeks, and in some cases, even days after becoming romantically involved with her. When connected to men she was openly having an affair with, she would invariably concoct stories of them being "unfaithful" and having "abandoned her".

She was caught after having poisoned her last lover, a bank officer named Milorad; his wife reported his disappearance to the Police, who ignored her. But she pursued her own investigation and rapidly found that Vera was her husband's mistress. She went back to the Police, who send two inspectors to the chateau. She admitted to them that Milorad had been her lover, but that he had quit her. Impressed by her beauty, wealth and excellent reputation, the Police abandoned their search. The wife went back to the Police and started to ask questions which should have been asked long time ago: where was her husband Joseph? Where was their son? What happen to the numerous other men who people knew they were her lover and had also disappeared?  The Police went back to see her; not only she then denied that Milorad was her lover, which she had admitted before, but the Police had a proof, a love letter sent by her to her lover. The Police got a search warrant and discovered a locked round cellar underground. In it were 35 spaces, each with a zinc-lined coffin inside. In the middle of the cellar were a red armchair, a big church candle and an empty bottle of champagne. She told them that it was all family members, but they insisted in opening one coffin, in which was the decomposed body of a man ; they then opened all the others ones, in which they found the same thing. Arrested, she confessed that she had poisoned all of them with arsenic when she suspected they had been unfaithful to her or when she believed their interest in her was waning . She also confessed to the police that, on occasion, she liked to sit in the armchair, surrounded by the coffins of all her former lovers.

She was convicted of 35 murders and sentenced to death, but, at that time, Yugoslavia did not execute women. She was instead condemned to life in prison. During her trial, she had started showing signs of dementia. It became worse and worse in prison (she ended up talking to her victims and screaming obscenities). She died in 1960. Some have speculated that Renczi's story may have inspired Joseph Kesselring's play Arsenic and Old Lace, yet this is incorrect. It was the Amy Archer-Gilligan case which the playwright used as his model.

In 2005, The Discovery Channel's three-part series Deadly Women recounted the history of Renczi, portrayed through reenactments and commentaries from FBI agents and criminal profiler Candice DeLong and a forensic pathologist. Renczi was featured in the series' first episode titled "Obsession", where she is described as having killed her victims in the "1930s in Bucharest, Romania". As for her motivation, the voice-over says that "modern analysis suggest she was simply looking for love".

On 17 March 2012, a depiction of Renczi appeared in the Daily Mirror, but it was proved to be a misidentified 2004 photograph, and an apology was printed.

See also 
 Baba Anujka 
 Béla Kiss
 List of serial killers by number of victims

References

Further reading
Jones, Richard Glyn. The Mammoth Book of Women Who Kill. Transition Vendor. 2002. 
Tolischus, O. [Otto] B. Woman Held For Killing 35 Persons Slew Lovers and Preserved Bodies In Cans In Her Cellar, syndicated (Universal Service), The Bee (Danville, Va.), May 22, 1925, p. 6 (the name is given as Madame Renici in this article)
A Real Female Bluebeard Strange Tragedy of the Jealous Beauty and Her Thirty-five Unlucky Sweethearts, American Weekly (San Antonio Light Sunday magazine section), Aug. 22, 1925, p. 5
Siân Lavinia Anaïs Valeriana better known by her artist name The Raveness made Renczi the subject of one of her most popular poems to date, taken from her 2006 book Lavinia: Volume one . The poem is entitled A coffin for a bed referring to Vera's method for murder. Prior to the books release in 2003, the poem was previously featured on her debut poetry extended-play self-titled The Raveness.

See also
List of serial killers by country

External links
Francis Farmer's Revenge: Types of female Serial Killers

1903 births
1960 deaths
1920s murders in Hungary 
1920 murders in Hungary
1930 murders in Hungary
20th-century criminals
Filicides
Hungarian people convicted of murder
Hungarian people who died in prison custody
Hungarian prisoners sentenced to life imprisonment
Mariticides
People convicted of murder by Romania
People from Bucharest
People whose existence is disputed
Poisoners
Prisoners sentenced to life imprisonment by Romania
Prisoners who died in Romanian detention
Romanian female murderers
Romanian people convicted of murder
Romanian people of Hungarian descent
Romanian people who died in prison custody
Romanian prisoners sentenced to life imprisonment
Romanian serial killers
Serial killers who died in prison custody
Violence against men in Europe
Year of birth unknown